Tell Me, What Is the Bane of Your Life is a song by Philip and His Foetus Vibrations, written by J. G. Thirlwell. It was released as a single in January 1982 by Self Immolation.

Formats and track listing 
All songs written by J. G. Thirlwell
UK 7" single (WOMB KX 07)
"Tell Me, What Is the Bane of Your Life" – 
"Mother, I've Killed the Cat" –

Personnel
Adapted from the Tell Me, What Is the Bane of Your Life liner notes.
 J. G. Thirlwell (as Philip and His Foetus Vibrations) – vocals, instruments, production
 Geoff Pesche – mastering

Charts

Release history

References

External links
Tell Me, What Is the Bane of Your Life at foetus.org

1982 songs
1982 singles
Foetus (band) songs
Songs written by JG Thirlwell
Song recordings produced by JG Thirlwell